Brusnovolovsky Pogost is a rural locality (a village) in Gorodishchenskoye Rural Settlement, Nyuksensky District, Vologda Oblast, Russia. The population was 98 as of 2002. There are 4 streets.

Geography 
Brusnovolovsky Pogost is located 55 km southwest of Nyuksenitsa (the district's administrative centre) by road. Dor is the nearest rural locality.

References 

Rural localities in Nyuksensky District